Awadh "Swaleh Nguru" Sherman ( ( October 4, 1932 - 1972) was a Kenyan business magnate, investor and philanthropist. He was of Yemeni descent and started out from humble beginnings as a fish monger selling Kingfish "Nguru".

He was of significant net worth and owns some of the largest ranches in Kenya. Despite, being one of the biggest land owners in Kenya, he was also recognized by the Government of Kenya and the United Nations for his philanthropic efforts in protecting and helping Somali refugees, and for his conservational efforts around Kenya.
http://kenyalaw.org/caselaw/cases/view/116850

Early life
Awadh was born in Bondeni, Mombasa. He is the son of Saleh Sherman and Salha Sherman. He is the eldest of eight siblings. His father, Saleh, was a taxi driver, and Awadh would from time to time help out his father with his work. This led to Awadh's love for cars. At an early age he set up a bicycle repair shop in Tudor, which later became Swaleh Nguru Garage. The garage was very popular with historical figures such as Jomo Kenyatta and Tom Mboya.

Business career
Awadh started Swaleh Nguru Garage, repairing and selling second hand vehicles. He later, invested heavily into real estate, construction and ranching. At one point he owned a third of Mombasa Island, mainly the town of Majengo. He later subdivided the land into sub-plots and sold them.

He is the founder, chairman and chief executive officer of Kilindini Warehouses and AGRO Processors, which are some of the major corporations in his conglomerate. He has traded in other commodities such as grain, tea, coffee and nuts. He owns one of the largest sisal plantations in Kenya at Taru, making him the main sisal producer and exporter. He also owns several large real estate in Kenya, which have been a topic of controversy in the media with relatives claiming rights to his wealth and squatters being evicted on his land has caused riots.

Philanthropy
He is a leading conservationist in Kenya protecting over 100,000 hectares of forest and wildlife. His most notable conservancy is in Kipini, Nairobi Ranch. Swaleh Nguru Camp, was a donation to the UNHCR to settle and provide for refugees.

Recognition
Swaleh Nguru Road in Tudor was named in his honor.
He has also received the Head of State Commendation and several recognitions from UNEP, UNHCR, and WFP.

Personal life
Awadh married Dalila Juma on April 14, 1960. They live in Kilifi, Mombasa and lead a simple life away from the public eye. He is an extremely reclusive billionaire, who does not like to be involved in politics. His family is known to be very philanthropic. Although they do not disclose their charitable work, they have been known to donate much of their wealth for feeding programs and land settlements of displaced peoples.

See also
 List of wealthiest people in Kenya
 List of African millionaires
 List of Kenyans
 Hadhrami people
 Arab diaspora

Notes
Awadh is referred to as Swaleh Nguru. His father was also referred to as Swaleh Nguru.

References 

Kenyan businesspeople
Kenyan philanthropists
Kenyan conservationists
Kenyan Muslims
People from Mombasa
Kenyan people of Yemeni descent
Hadhrami people
1932 births
Living people